USS Melvin (DD-335) was a  in service with the United States Navy from 1921 to 1930. She was scrapped in 1931.

Description
The Clemson class was a repeat of the preceding  although more fuel capacity was added. They had a crew of 6 officers and 108 enlisted men.

Performance differed radically between the ships of the class, often due to poor workmanship. The Clemson class was powered by two steam turbines, each driving one propeller shaft, using steam provided by four water-tube boilers.

The ships were armed with four 4-inch (102 mm) guns in single mounts and were fitted with two  1-pounder guns for anti-aircraft defense. In many ships a shortage of 1-pounders caused them to be replaced by 3-inch (76 mm) guns. Their primary weapon, though, was their torpedo battery of a dozen 21 inch (533 mm) torpedo tubes in four triple mounts. They also carried a pair of depth charge rails. A "Y-gun" depth charge thrower was added to many ships.

Construction and career
Melvin, named for Lieutenant (junior grade) John T. Melvin, was laid down 15 September 1920 at the Union Plant, Bethlehem Shipbuilding Corporation, San Francisco, California; launched 11 April 1921; sponsored by Miss Laura L. McKinistry; and commissioned 31 May 1921. Following a brief shakedown, Melvin began operations off the west coast, which was to be her primary cruising area for her entire career, with a round-trip voyage to San Diego, California. During her 9 years in commission Melvin thrice transited the Panama Canal for Caribbean-based fleet problems, 1923, 1924, and 1927. Following such operations in the latter year, she cruised north to New York City and Newport, Rhode Island before sailing for Nicaragua. Arriving in the Bluefields area 25 June, she remained until 6 July to lend support, if needed, to marines then charged with supervising the establishment of the Nicaraguan Guardia Nacional and maintaining an uneasy truce. Exercises and type training in Hawaiian waters also interrupted her west coast operations and, subsequent to such maneuvers in the spring of 1925, she completed her only roundtrip cruise across the Pacific, a good will tour which took her to Samoa, Australia, and New Zealand.

On 17 July 1929, Melvin entered the Navy yard at Mare Island, San Francisco, to begin inactivation. Arriving on the 11th, she decommissioned 8 May 1930 and on the 10th was towed back to Mare Island for scrapping. Struck from the Naval Vessel Register 3 November 1930, her materials were sold in the course of the next 2 years.

Notes

References

External links

http://www.navsource.org/archives/05/335.htm

 

Clemson-class destroyers
Ships built in San Francisco
1921 ships